The Utica Pent-Ups (alternately, the Pentups) were a professional baseball team based in Utica, New York, that played in the International Association for the 1878 season, the National Association in 1879, and different incarnations of the New York State League. The Pent-Ups were members of the first New York State League (which became the International League in 1886) from 1885 to 1887, the second from 1889 to 1890, and the third from 1898 to 1909. Many major-league baseball players played for the team, including outfielder George Burns, who won a World Series with the New York Giants in 1921.

References

Defunct minor league baseball teams
Baseball teams established in 1901
1901 establishments in New York (state)
1909 disestablishments in New York (state)
Sports clubs disestablished in 1909
Utica, New York
Defunct baseball teams in New York (state)
New York State League teams
Baseball teams disestablished in 1909